"The Last Goodbye" is a song by the British rock band Steve Harley & Cockney Rebel, which was released in 2006 as a single from their 2005 studio album The Quality of Mercy. The song was written by Harley and ex-Cockney Rebel guitarist Jim Cregan, and produced by Harley.

Background
In 2005, Harley recorded a new studio album, The Quality of Mercy, with his current touring line-up of Cockney Rebel. The album, including "The Last Goodbye", was recorded at Gemini Recording Studios in Ipswich, and was mastered by Denis Blackham at Skye Mastering. The Quality of Mercy, which was released in October 2005 by Gott Discs, was the first studio album to be released under the band's name since 1976. As Harley's first single since 2001's "A Friend for Life", the album's opening track "The Last Goodbye" was released as a single in February 2006. "The Last Goodbye" peaked at number 186 in the UK Singles Chart and number 21 in the UK Independent Singles Chart Top 50.

Release
"The Last Goodbye" was released by Gott Discs as a 7-inch CD single in the UK only, with Pinnacle Records handling the single's distribution. The single's sleeve features a close-up photograph of Harley which was taken by Mick Rock. The B-side "Understand" is a seven-minute live recording of the song originally recorded for Cockney Rebel's 1976 album Timeless Flight. This live version was recorded at Blackheath Concert Hall in London during 2001 and was produced by Harley.

Promotion
"The Last Goodbye" was featured in the set-list during the band's 50+ date UK and European tour promoting The Quality of Mercy. Footage of the band performing the song live has since surfaced on YouTube. In an online diary entry dated 14 November 2005, Harley spoke of performing the song at a concert in Holland, "Last night I sang 'The Last Goodbye' entirely alone, largo, slow and dignified to open the show, until Robbie entered for a solo." After 2005, the song would be played during the band's 2006 UK and Europe tour, and used as the opening track for the band's May–July 2008 UK tour. Since 2008, however, the song has been very rarely featured in Harley and the band's set-lists.

Critical reception
In a review of The Quality of Mercy, Birmingham 101 Gig Guide commented, "Co-penned by ex-Rebel Jim Cregan, 'The Last Goodbye' shows Harley's ability to pen classic, radio friendly quality pop hasn't dimmed with the years." Carol Clerk of Classic Rock wrote, "The Quality of Mercy is brimful of songs that are intensely personal and sometimes harrowing but, musically, very approachable. The bright up-tempos of 'The Last Goodbye' and the lovely, gentle melodies that carry 'Journey's End' and 'A Friend for Life' offset the deep anxieties at the heart of the lyrics." John Aizelwood of Q highlighted the song as one of three "Download" pick tracks from the album.

Stein Østbø of the Norwegian website VG commented that Harley "still writes beautiful, melodic songs in a safe pop-rock landscape, including the initial 'The Last Goodbye'". Rune Westengen of the Norwegian website RB described the song as a "more rocking, Costello-like track". In a review of the band's 2008 concert at the Birmingham Town Hall, Birmingham Mail noted that the show opened with the "wonderful" "The Last Goodbye".

Track listing
7-inch single
"The Last Goodbye" – 3:54
"Understand" (Live) – 7:03

CD single
"The Last Goodbye" – 3:54
"Understand" (Live) – 7:03

Personnel
The Last Goodbye
 Steve Harley – vocals, guitar, producer
 Robbie Gladwell – electric guitar
 Barry Wickens – acoustic guitar
 James Lascelles – keyboards
 Lincoln Anderson – bass
 Adam Houghton – drums

Understand (Live)
 Steve Harley – vocals
 Robbie Gladwell – electric guitar, backing vocals
 Barry Wickens – acoustic guitar, backing vocals
 James Lascelles – piano
 Lincoln Anderson – bass
 Adam Houghton – drums
 Vikki Beebee – percussion, backing vocals

Production
 Steve Harley – producer
 Pat Grueber – recording engineer on "The Last Goodbye"
 Matt Butler – remix engineer on "The Last Goodbye"
 Denis Blackham – mastering on "The Last Goodbye"

Other
 Asgard – representation
 Mick Rock – cover photo
 Mark Scarfe at Aarlsen – original sleeve design
 CLE Print – reprographics

Charts

References

2005 songs
2006 singles
Steve Harley songs
Songs written by Steve Harley
Songs written by Jim Cregan